Bogura Polytechnic Institute or BPI is a Government Technical Institute in Bogura, Bangladesh. It is one of the largest polytechnic institutes in Bangladesh.

History

In early 1962, Ford Foundation established Bogura Polytechnic Institute, with a duration of 3 years long courses, based on the syllabus of Oklahoma State University, Stillwater, USA. The certificate issued by the then Technical Board Education was "Associated in Engineering" having provision to undergo B.S course in the US and also in the UK Its formation and academic course history details goes back to the birth of Ahsanullah Engineering College, which is now known as BUET.

Administration
Institute Name   		: 	Bogura Polytechnic Institute, Bogura
 Principal			:	Eng. Md. Jaynal Abden (Incharge)  
Village Road      		: 	Sherpur Road
Post Office     		        : 	Bogura
Union Word	     		:   	Ward No-12
Thana Upazila    		:    	Bogura Sadar
Establish Date   		:   	17 September 1962
Reg. Date 	    		:   	17 September 1962
Class Room 	    		:   	52
Male Student	                :	3460 (Approximately)  
Female Student        		:	850 (Approximately)  
Total Teacher		        :       100 (Approximately)  
Total Staff : 90
Male Hostel Seat       		:      Available
Female Hostel Seat   		:	Available

Location
Bogura Polytechnic Institute is located at Colony in the southern part of the Bogra city in Bangladesh. It is near the Police Line and Vocational Teachers Training Institute (VTTI).

Academic programs
It offers Diploma Level Programmes for Diploma-in-Engineering in many different technological areas, each required to study for a 4-year-long curriculum.

Students can participate in:

Civil Technology.--200
Electrical Technology.--300
Mechanical Technology.--300
Power Technology.--100
Electronics Technology.--100
Computer Technology.--100
Refrigeration & air-condition Department. --100

Halls of residence
There are two Boy's and one Girl's dormitories. About 1 thousand residential students stay here.

North Hostel
South Hostel
Korotoa Girls Hostel

Directorates

The institute operates under the executive control of the Ministry of Education(MOE) acting through the Directorate of Technical Education (DTE).[3] The academic programs, curriculums are maintained under the regulation of the Bangladesh Technical Education Board (BTEB).[4] BTEB functions under Directorate of Inspection and Audit (DIA), which in turn functions under Chief Accounts Office (CAO), and it functions under MOE.

See also 
 Education in Bangladesh
 Bangladesh Institute of Information Technology

References

Polytechnic institutes in Bangladesh
Information technology in Bangladesh
Organisations based in Bogra District
Educational institutions established in 1962
1960s establishments in East Pakistan